Meir Argov (1905 – 24 November 1963) was a Zionist activist, Israeli politician and a signatory of the Israeli declaration of independence.

Biography
Born Meyer Grabovsky in Rîbnița in the Russian Empire (today in Transnistria/Moldova), Argov studied at a heder and then at Kiev University. He became involved in Zionist activism in his youth, heading the HeHalutz movement in Ukraine, and becoming a member of the Tzeiri Zion central committee in 1917. He was arrested for Zionist activities in 1922, and again in 1924, after which he was expelled from the Soviet Union.

In 1927 he immigrated to Mandate Palestine and worked in agriculture. A secretary of the Petah Tikva Workers council between 1929 and 1939, he became a member of the Jewish National Council in 1930 and was elected onto Petah Tikva's municipal council in 1931. In 1940 he volunteered for the British Army and fought in the Jewish Brigade in Italy.

Argov (still under the name Grabovsky) was one of the signatories of Israel's declaration of independence in 1948, and immediately joined the Provisional State Council, representing Mapai. He was elected to the first Knesset in 1949, and retained his seat in elections in 1951, 1955, 1959 and 1961, serving as chair of the important Foreign Affairs and Defense Committee from 1951 onwards. He died in office in 1963. His seat was taken by Jenia Tversky.

References

External links

1905 births
1963 deaths
People from Rîbnița
Soviet emigrants to Mandatory Palestine
Jews in Mandatory Palestine
Mapai politicians
Members of the Assembly of Representatives (Mandatory Palestine)
Jews from the Russian Empire
Soviet Jews
Moldovan Jews
Israeli people of Moldovan-Jewish descent
Signatories of the Israeli Declaration of Independence
British Army personnel of World War II
Taras Shevchenko National University of Kyiv alumni
Members of the 1st Knesset (1949–1951)
Members of the 2nd Knesset (1951–1955)
Members of the 3rd Knesset (1955–1959)
Members of the 4th Knesset (1959–1961)
Members of the 5th Knesset (1961–1965)
Mandatory Palestine military personnel of World War II
Jewish Brigade personnel
Burials at Segula Cemetery